Maya Akiba is a Japanese judoka.

She won a medal at the 2021 World Judo Championships.

References

External links
 
 

1997 births
Living people
Japanese female judoka
World judo champions
Medalists at the 2019 Summer Universiade
Universiade medalists in judo
Universiade gold medalists for Japan
Universiade silver medalists for Japan
20th-century Japanese women
21st-century Japanese women